Lathonura is a genus of Macrothricidae.
''' is a genus of Macrothricidae.

The genus was described in 1853 by Lilljeborg.

It has cosmopolitan distribution.

Species:
 Lathonura dorsispina  Cosmovici, 1900
 Lathonura ovalis Mahoon, Ghauri & Butt, 1986
 Lathonura rectirostris''  (O.F. Müller, 1785)

References

Cladocera